Jaksici may refer to:

Jaksići, settlement in Serbia
Jakšici, Bajina Bašta, settlement in Serbia
Jakšiči, settlement in Kostel, Slovenia
Jakšići, Vrbovsko, settlement in Vrbovsko, Croatia
Jakšići, Zadar, settlement in Zadar, Croatia
Jakšići, Istria, settlement in Istria, Croatia
Donji Jakšići, settlement in Srpska, Bosnia and Herzegovina
Gornji Jakšići, settlement in Srpska, Bosnia and Herzegovina
Jakšić noble family (pl. Jakšići), Serbian noble house

See also 
 Jakšić (surname)